Popular Information is an American online newsletter launched in 2018 by Judd Legum.  it had 138,000 subscribers with around 5%–10% paid subscriptions. The name of the newsletter, "Popular Information", comes from a letter James Madison wrote in 1822.

"A popular Government, without popular information, or the means of acquiring it, is but a Prologue to a Farce or a Tragedy; or, perhaps both. Knowledge will forever govern ignorance: And a people who mean to be their own Governors, must arm themselves with the power which knowledge gives." — James Madison, 1882

Legum has a background in law, politics and journalism. He authors the newsletter which is delivered through Substack, a company which provides services to support subscription newsletters. He says his newsletter is about politics and power though he has covered many topics including corporate donations to politicians and Facebook's struggles with its advertising guidelines. He seeks out stories he thinks media outlets won't be covering and does a deep analysis, focusing on national issues. Legum's business model is to attract paying subscribers through delivering in-depth reporting while eschewing ad dollars, and the newsletter contains no advertising. In 2020, Popular Information was expanded by hiring a full-time research assistant.

In 2020 the Online News Association gave Popular Information an award for excellence in journalism, saying the newsletter had reported extensively on online misinformation, particularly focusing on Facebook, and that its reports on several nationwide companies created positive changes in working conditions for their employees. Its investigative reporting exposed a pro-Trump network of Facebook pages operating out of Ukraine, which were promptly shut down by Facebook, and the newsletter's reports have been cited in numerous national and local news outlets. According to Online News Association, "Popular Information demonstrates that newsletters can do far more than summarize the news. They can be a powerful vehicle to create change."

References

External links 
 

Newsletters
Publications established in 2018
Online publishing companies of the United States
Newspapers published in Washington, D.C.